Tus is a river of the Province of Albacete, Spain.

Rivers of Spain
Rivers of the Province of Albacete
Rivers of Castilla–La Mancha